Fidan is a female name of Turkish origin meaning "sapling". The word however has Greek roots. It was among the most popular names for girls born in 2008 in Azerbaijan.

Given name
 Fidan Gasimova, Azerbaijani singer

Surname
 Hikmet Fidan, Turkish politician

Notes

Turkish feminine given names